Into the Abyss is the seventh studio album by Swedish melodic death metal band Hypocrisy. It was released on 22 May 2000 by Nuclear Blast. A digipak version of the album was also released.

Track listing

Credits

Band members
Peter Tägtgren − vocals, guitar, keyboards
Lars Szöke − drums
Mikael Hedlund − bass

Production
Produced by Peter Tägtgren
Co-produced by Lars Szöke
Recorded and mixed at The Abyss, April 2000
Mastered by Peter In De Betou at Cutting Room, Stockholm, Sweden

Songwriting and composition
Lyrics by Peter Tägtgren
All arrangements by Hypocrisy
Orchestra on the song "Fire in the Sky" written by Peter Tägtgren

Charts

References

Hypocrisy (band) albums
2000 albums
Nuclear Blast albums
Albums produced by Peter Tägtgren